Ontario High School is a public high school located in Ontario, Oregon, United States. It is a part of Ontario School District 8C.

History

Earlier in 2015 the Four Rivers Community School charter school, then a K-8 school, proposed getting a grant from the Oregon Department of Education so it could establish a dual English-Spanish literacy program  and high level Spanish courses for Four Rivers graduates at Ontario High. In December 2015 Four Rivers instead proposed establishing its own high school.

Demographics
The demographic breakdown of the 726 students enrolled in 2013-2014 was:
Male - 48.5%
Female - 51.5%
Native American/Alaskan - 1.1%
Asian/Pacific Islanders - 2.1%
Black - 0.8%
Hispanic - 60.3%
White - 34.5%
Multiracial - 1.2%

71.6% of the students were eligible for free or reduced lunch.

Athletics
The Ontario Tigers are part of the Greater Oregon League. The school colors are cardinal and corn. The following OSAA sanctioned sports are offered:

Baseball (boys')
Basketball (boys' and girls')
Cheerleading (boys' and girls')
Cross country (boys' and girls')
Football (boys')
Golf (boys' and girls')
Soccer (boys' and girls')
Softball (girls')
Tennis (boys' and girls')
Track (boys' and girls')
Volleyball (girls')
Wrestling (boys')

Notable alumni 
 Michael Echanis, Vietnam veteran, Purple Heart recipient, martial arts instructor and author, Class of '69
 A. J. Feeley, former NFL quarterback
 Joe Delgado, Decathlete at the University of Oregon and the University of Louisville

References

External links
School website
School District 8C

High schools in Malheur County, Oregon
Ontario, Oregon
Public high schools in Oregon